Neagylla is a monotypic moth genus in the subfamily Arctiinae erected by George Hampson in 1900. Its single species, Neagylla nevosa, was first described by Paul Dognin in 1894. It is found in Ecuador.

References

Lithosiini
Monotypic moth genera
Moths of South America